North Iowa Area Community College (NIACC) is a public community college in Mason City, Iowa.

History
NIACC began as Mason City Junior College in 1918, becoming the first public two-year college in Iowa. The college was located in the high school until 1953, when it moved to the Memorial University Building. In 1965, Mason City Junior College transformed into North Iowa Area Community College (Merged Area II) and moved into the former high school in downtown Mason City. In 1970, the college moved to its current campus on the east edge of Mason City.

Athletics
North Iowa Area Community College's athletic teams are nicknamed the Trojans. NIACC is a member of the National Junior College Athletic Association and the Iowa Community College Athletic Conference

Sports teams
Baseball (Men)
Basketball (Men and Women)
Cross Country (Men and Women)
Golf  (Men and Women)
Soccer (Men and Women)
Softball (Women)
Track & Field (Men and Women)
Volleyball (Women)
Wrestling (Men and Women)

Notable alumni
Marshal Yanda, National Football League (NFL) offensive guard

References

External links

Buildings and structures in Mason City, Iowa
Community colleges in Iowa
Education in Cerro Gordo County, Iowa
NJCAA athletics